Gerardo Taracena (born 1970) is a Mexican film and theatre actor and dancer. He is known for his roles in Apocalypto, Man on Fire, The Mexican and Sin Nombre as well as the Netflix series Narcos: Mexico. He was born in Mexico City.

Biography

Early life 
Gerardo Taracena studied Dramatic Art in the University Center of Theater of the National Autonomous University of Mexico.
In 1992 he acted in diverse festivals of theater and dance with the group of dance Integro of Peru, until 1996.

Career 

He is known to have taken part in a diverse selection of festivals across the whole of Latin America, and has performed in more than 30 works of theatrical acts. Gerardo Taracena was also enrolled in the theatrical group Theater Myth.
His production on film and TV has grown both in Mexico and the United States.  He appeared in the Mexican film Saving Private Perez, released in 2011, with fellow Mexican actor Jaime Camil.

Filmography

Film

Television roles

References

External links 

1970 births
Ariel Award winners
Living people
Mexican male dancers
Mexican male film actors
Male actors from Mexico City
21st-century Mexican male actors
Mexican male stage actors
21st-century Mexican dancers